Chrysoglossa fumosa is a moth of the family Notodontidae first described by James S. Miller in 2008. It is found in Panama.

The length of the forewings is 18 mm for males. The ground color of the forewings is uneven olive brown to dark brown, without obvious markings. The hindwings are uniformly light brown to gray brown, also without markings.

Etymology
The name fumosa was coined by Warren in 1905 and is apparently derived from the Latin word fumidus (meaning smoked or full of smoke) and probably refers to the smoky brown forewing and hindwing color.

References

Moths described in 2008
Notodontidae